Anastasia Dmitrievna Bezrukova (born 5 January 2004) is a Russian model and actress.

Biography
Anastasia Bezrukova was born in Moscow. At the age of ten, she was one of the most in-demand child models in Europe. She had also been on the cover of Vogue Bambini.

In 2016 she debuted on screen in one of the lead roles in 's movie .

Furthermore, in October 2015 Bezrukova joined the cast of another Anna Matison movie, titled After You're Gone. For her role she took dance lessons from choreographer Radu Poklitaru and acting lessons from Moscow's Bolshoi Theatre ballet dancer . Again she starred as the daughter of a retired ballet dancer who faces a progressing illness. The scenario was written with Bezrukova in mind, but without knowing that she had practiced rhythmic gymnastics and consequently wouldn't require a stunt double.

She has also starred in a music video for a project titled "Sleeplessness".

Filmography

References

External links 
 Anastasia Bezrukova at Kinopoisk 
 

2004 births
Living people
Female models from Moscow
Russian child actresses
Russian film actresses
Actresses from Moscow
Child models